The City Cup was a rugby league competition involving Australian premiership teams. The post season tournament was a regular feature in the years 1912–1925. City Cups were also played in 1937, 1942 and 1959.

The inaugural city cup was contested in 1912 between Glebe and South Sydney with South Sydney winning the final.

Premiers

See also

Amco Cup
NSW Challenge Cup
New South Wales Rugby League premiership
Presidents Cup (Rugby League)
Tooheys Challenge Cup

References

Rugby league competitions in Australia
Recurring sporting events established in 1912
1912 establishments in Australia
Sports leagues established in 1912
National cup competitions